is a Japanese–Filipino gravure idol, actress, fashion model and singer best known for being a member of  Ladybaby.

Background
Kaneko's mother is of Spanish and Filipino descent and her father is Japanese.

In September 2014 Rie Kaneko was co-Grand Prix winner (along with Shizu Mizuno) of the 2015 Miss iD audition. In her audition video Kaneko danced "Loving U" from K-pop group SISTAR.

In March 2015, along with Rei Kuromiya, a nominated Miss iD 2015, and Ladybeard, a crossdressing professional wrestler, formed the idol group "LADYBABY".  
In August of the same year, she featured on Haji Metal's "GIRI GAL". She also sang track numbers 2, 4, and 6 of "SUPER SOLO 2" which is a bundled album of GIRIGAL.

February 2016, Kaneko obtained the Grand Prix at Hakusensha "Young Animal" NEXT Gravure Queen Battle 4th Season.
In March 2016, in an interview to the high school graduation of the week pre-News, she talked about "I did not like being told to be a high school student", and has since dropped out of high school.
On August 1, 2016, after the band rebranded from "LADYBABY" to "The Idol Formerly Known As LADYBABY" the band resumed their activities after a hiatus.

Since June 2017, she started her own channel called "Rie Kaneko's "Title Missed" channel" at the video distribution service "FRESH!", operated by Cyber Agent, and periodically delivers member-only live delivery. On September 18, she held her first fan meeting on this channel.

Ilie 
Kaneko debuted under the solo project Ilie (stylized: ilie) on July 10, 2021 with "aimai" as its first music video uploaded on its official YouTube channel; itself created on July 6, 2021. This has since been followed by further music video uploads on August 20, 2021 with "fukashigi", September 1, 2021 with "syukufuku", and on October 30, 2021 with "kamishibai".

Japanese composer Sakurai Kenta of Ekoms Co. Ltd. serves as Ilie's label manager and music producer. The label also works with Japanese artists such as KATY, and Haze.

A November 2021 tour was announced on September 30 2021. It had three dates: November 12, 14, and 18 respectively.

Ilie announced its official fan club at its official Twitter page on January 1, 2022.

REIRIE 
In January 2023, Kaneko got back together with Rei Kuromiya to form the idol group REIRIE after working separately for five years.
The group announced their first live shortly after debut, which will occur on March 25, 2023.

Discography

As ilie

As trolleattroll

As featured artist

Videography

Movies

Tv Shows

Music Videos

Gravure Idol DVDs

Bibliography
 2015: Sayonara Youthful Days Miss iD 2015 Official Photo Collection Book 
 2016: Rie Kaneko [Calendar 2017 (Try-X Ltd.)]
 2017: Kaneko Rie First Photo Book Let me do Whatever I want 
 2017: Kaneko Rie First Trading Card 
 2018: Kaneko Rie -20- Trading Card Box
 2018: LADYBABY Rie Kaneko Photobook: ambiguous 
 2018: Kaneko Rie -SAYONARA HEISEI- Vol.3 Trading Card Box
 2019: Rie Kaneko Photobook: NEVER END BLUE

References

External links
 Official Profile 
 Profile at Transit General Service 
 Official Blog (Powered by Ameba) 
 Official Twitter 
 Official FRESH! 
 

1997 births
Living people
Japanese gravure idols
Japanese women pop singers
21st-century Japanese actresses
Japanese people of Spanish descent
Japanese people of Filipino descent
Singers from Tokyo
Kawaii metal musicians
21st-century Japanese women singers
21st-century Japanese singers
Japanese women heavy metal singers